Gariaon is a village in Jaunpur district in the Indian state of Uttar Pradesh. It is also known as Gariaon Bazar. Gariaon is located 6 km kilometres north-west of Janghai Junction Railway Station and 13 km east of Mungra Badshahpur.

Population
 The population in Gariaon village is 2,661 as per the survey of census during 2011 by Indian Government.
 There are 332 House Holds in Gariaon.
 There are 1,341 males (50%); There are 1,320 females (50%).
 Scheduled Cast are 749 (28%)
 Total Scheduled Tribe are 0 (0% ).
 Literates in Gariaon are 1,541 (58%).
 There are 1,120 total Illiterates (42% ).
 Literates are 1,541 (58% ) and total Illiterates 1,120 (42%) in Gariaon.
 Workers are 612 (23%). 438 are regular and 174 are Irregular.
 There are 2,04559 Non Workers (77%).

Educational institutes

Schools
 T.R. Memorial Primary School
 Primary School Kathari Pur 
 Samar Bahadur Singh Public School 
 Madarsa Gulshane Raja 
 Madarsa Arbia Gausia Talimul Goran
 Samar Bahadur Singh Public Junior High school

College
 Samar Bahadur Singh Intermediate College
 Khemraj Shukla Inter College

Other organizations

 Shanti Nandan Bauddha Welfare Society

Transportation

Rail
Gariaon is well-connected with all major cities of India thanks to Indian Railways. It has two nearby railway stations: Janghai Junction (JNH) and Badshahpur (BSE). Janghai Jn, and Badshapur railway stations are easily reachable from here.

Road
Gariaon is well-connected to Lucknow, Gorakhpur, Varanasi, Allahabad and other cities like Azamgarh, Mirzapur, 
Janghai, Sultanpur, Ghazipur etc.

Airport
Lal Bahadur Shastri Airport or Varanasi Airport (IATA: VNS, ICAO: VIBN) is a public airport located at Babatpur 18 km (11 mi) northwest of Varanasi, and about 80 km from Gariaon Village. It located at Jaunpur-Varanasi highway.

References

Villages in Jaunpur district